Evangelical and Reformed Church is a historic church at the junction of Grand and Ohio Streets in Vermilion, Ohio.

The church building was constructed in 1868 and added to the National Register of Historic Places in 1979. The church is now affiliated with the Conservative Congregational Christian Conference.

References

External links
Official church website

Conservative Congregational Christian Conference churches in Ohio
Churches on the National Register of Historic Places in Ohio
Italianate architecture in Ohio
Churches completed in 1868
Churches in Erie County, Ohio
National Register of Historic Places in Erie County, Ohio
Italianate church buildings in the United States